Robert Davidson (1750–1812) was an American educator.

Life
Davidson was born in Elkton, Maryland. He graduated at the University of Pennsylvania in 1771, was appointed instructor there in 1773, and in 1774 was given the chair of history and belles-lettres. 

In 1774 Davidson was also licensed to preach, and a year later was ordained by the second Philadelphia presbytery, becoming Dr. Ewing's assistant in the first church. In 1775 he composed a metrical dialogue, which was recited at commencement before the Continental Congress, and in July of the same year, one month after the battle of Bunker Hill, delivered before several military companies a sermon from the text “For there fell down many slain, because the war was of God.” 

In 1777 the occupation of Philadelphia by the British compelled Davidson to retire to Delaware. In 1783, Davidson was elected a member of the American Philosophical Society. In 1784 he was appointed vice-president of the newly organized Dickinson College, Carlisle, Pennsylvania, and given the chair of history and belles-lettres there, also acting as pastor of the Presbyterian church in Carlisle. He held this last office for the rest of his life, and succeeded in harmonizing a discordant congregation. In 1794 he preached twice before troops on their way to suppress the whiskey insurrection, and in 1799 delivered a eulogy of Washington. After Dr. Nisbet's death in 1804, Davidson discharged the duties of president of the college till 1809, when he resigned.

Davidson had a reputation as a scholar, but was especially interested astronomy, and invented a cosmosphere or compound globe. He was also a skillful draughtsman, and was a composer of sacred music. Besides sermons, he published an “Epitome of Geography, in Verse,” for the use of schools (1784); “The Christian's A, B, C,” or the 119th psalm in metre, each stanza beginning with a different letter (1811); and a “New Metrical Version of the Psalms,” with annotations (1812). 

Davidson died 13 December 1812.

Family
His son, Robert Davidson, clergyman, b. in Carlisle, Pa., 23 Feb., 1808; d. in Philadelphia, Pa., 6 April 1876, was graduated at Dickinson college in 1828, and at Princeton Theological Seminary in 1831. He was pastor of the second Presbyterian church in Lexington, Kentucky, in 1832-'40, and in the latter year became president of Transylvania University there. After his resignation in 1842 he held pastorates in New Brunswick, New Jersey, in 1843-1859, New York City in 1860-64, and Huntington, Long Island, in 1864-68, moving again to Philadelphia in the latter year. Davidson was for a quarter of a century a member of the American Board of Commissioners for Foreign Missions, was permanent clerk of the General Assembly in 1845-1850, and in 1869 was a delegate to the General Assembly of the Free Church of Scotland, in Edinburgh.

Notes

References

American educators
1750 births
1812 deaths
18th-century American people
19th-century American people
University of Pennsylvania alumni
Presbyterian Church in the United States of America ministers
People from Elkton, Maryland